Tevfik Bıyıklıoğlu (1891 – 24 November 1961) was a Turkish politician, who was a founding member of the Turkish Historical Association, which he served as its first president.

References 

1891 births
1961 deaths
Place of death missing
People from Çanakkale
Republican People's Party (Turkey) politicians
20th-century Turkish politicians